Wadge is a surname. Notable people with the surname include:

Amy Wadge (born 1975), English singer and songwriter
Eric Wadge, musician
Richard Wadge (1864–1923), English football manager

See also
Wedge (surname)